Ab Rizak or Abrizak may refer to:

Ab Rizak, Bagh-e Malek, Khuzestan Province
Abrizak, Kohgiluyeh and Boyer-Ahmad
Ab Rizak, Lorestan

See also
 Abrizaki (disambiguation)